The Waterloo-Pinckney Trail is a 38-mile-long hiking trail which runs through Waterloo State Recreation Area and Pinckney Recreation Area in southeastern Michigan, United States. Part of the trail also passes through Park Lyndon County Park. The trail travels through glacial features such as eskers and kettle lakes as well as swamps and open meadows remaining from abandoned farmlands. Forest types include oak and pine. Other hills and ridges give  rises. The trail is blazed with blue triangles and at some points shares trails with the Potawatomi Trail and the nature trails around the Eddy Discovery Center. Part of the trail is open to mountain biking and horseriding and hunting is allowed in most areas along the trail. The trail has several nearby campgrounds allowing it to be hiked as a 2, 3 or 4 day trip. Side trails to the campgrounds make the entire trip .
The trail was first developed in the 1960s and the last link across the county park was completed in 1986.

References

External links

Waterloo map section
Pinckney map section

Hiking trails in Michigan
Long-distance trails in the United States